Arnjolt Beer (born 19 June 1946) is a retired French shot putter.

He was born in Koumac in New Caledonia, and represented the club Stade Français. He represented France at the 1968 and 1972 Olympic Games, where he did not reach the final. He won the silver medal at the 1967 Mediterranean Games, finished sixth at the 1968 European Indoor Games, eighth at the 1970 European Indoor Championships, thirteenth at the 1971 European Indoor Championships, tenth at the 1972 European Indoor Championships, tenth at the 1976 European Indoor Championships, and twelfth at the 1981 European Indoor Championships.

He became French champion in 1968, 1971, 1978 and 1980, and French indoor champion in 1975, 1977, 1978 and 1979. At the South Pacific Games Beer won the shot put in 1966, 1969, 1971, 1975 and 1983. He set a championship record with 18.07 metres in 1971, and equalled it in 1975. It withstood later competitions. Also, in the discus throw he won gold medals in 1969, 1971 and 1975 and silver medals in 1966 and 1983. Here, too, he set a championship record of 50.22 metres in 1969, but it was erased by French Polynesian Jean-Claude Duhaze in 1979. In the hammer throw Beer won a silver medal in 1975 and bronze medals in 1969 and 1971.

Achievements

References

1945 births
Living people
New Caledonian shot putters
French male shot putters
Athletes (track and field) at the 1968 Summer Olympics
Athletes (track and field) at the 1972 Summer Olympics
Olympic athletes of France
French people of New Caledonian descent
People from North Province, New Caledonia
New Caledonian male athletes
Mediterranean Games silver medalists for France
Mediterranean Games medalists in athletics
Athletes (track and field) at the 1967 Mediterranean Games